Dausdava was a Dacian town in Moesia between the Danube and the Balkan Mountains, in the region between Nicopolis (modern Nikopol, Bulgaria) and Abritus (modern Razgrad).

See also 
 Dacian davae
 List of ancient cities in Thrace and Dacia
 Dacia
 Roman Dacia

Notes

References

Ancient

Modern

Further reading

External links 

Dacian towns
Archaeological sites in Bulgaria
History of Eastern Romance people